
Gmina Zwierzyn is a rural gmina (administrative district) in Strzelce-Drezdenko County, Lubusz Voivodeship, in western Poland.

Villages
Gmina Zwierzyn contains the villages and settlements of Błotno, Brzezinka, Górczyna, Górecko, Górki, Gościmiec, Owczarki, Pełczyna, Przysieka, Rzekcin, Sarbiewo, Sierosławice, Zagaje, Żółwin and Zwierzyn.

Neighbouring gminas
Gmina Zwierzyn is bordered by the gminas of Drezdenko, Santok, Stare Kurowo and Strzelce Krajeńskie.

Twin towns – sister cities

Gmina Zwierzyn is twinned with:
 Rehfelde, Germany

References

Zwierzyn
Strzelce-Drezdenko County